Carrascosa is a village in Cuenca, Castile-La Mancha, Spain.

References

Municipalities in the Province of Cuenca